Howard Lake is a lake in British Columbia, Canada. It is located approximately 50 km northeast of 100 Mile House.

External links 
BC Adventure (Tourism)

Lakes of the Cariboo
Lillooet Land District